The Affaire in the Swing Age, also known as The Dynasty or Love Against Kingship, is a 2003 Chinese television series based on the novel Jiangshan Fengyu Qing by Zhu Sujin, who was also the screenwriter for the series. The series depicts the events in the transition of the Ming dynasty to the Qing dynasty in China, focusing on the lives of historical figures such as Li Zicheng, Wu Sangui, Chen Yuanyuan, the Chongzhen Emperor and Huangtaiji.

Plot
In 1627, the young Chongzhen Emperor succeeds his brother, the Tianqi Emperor, as the sovereign of the Ming dynasty, with help from the eunuch Wang Cheng'en. The hardworking Chongzhen Emperor strives to save his dwindling empire from collapse and seeks to restore it to its former glory. However, it seems impossible for him to achieve these goals because the Ming government has been plagued by corruption since his predecessors' time, and the people have also rebelled against him under the leadership of Li Zicheng. Besides, on the northern frontier, Huangtaiji, the ambitious ruler of the Manchu-led Qing dynasty, is actively preparing his army for an invasion of the Ming Empire.

Yuan Chonghuan and Hong Chengchou are both capable military commanders appointed by the Chongzhen Emperor to counter the Manchu invaders, but they meet different fates – the emperor orders Yuan to be executed by slow slicing after believing false accusations that Yuan is plotting against him; Hong is forced to surrender to the Manchus after his defeat at the Battle of Songjin, and he aids the Qing forces on their campaign against the Southern Ming dynasty later.

In 1644, Li Zicheng's rebel forces capture the Ming capital, Beijing. The Chongzhen Emperor commits suicide by hanging himself on a tree. Shortly after, Wu Sangui, a Ming general defending the border, defects to the Qing dynasty and opens Shanhai Pass, allowing the Qing forces to enter and overrun the rest of China. The reason behind Wu's defection is the loss of his beloved concubine, Chen Yuanyuan. Chen was initially kept as a hostage in Beijing to prevent Wu from betraying the Ming Empire. However, after the fall of Beijing, she was taken by Liu Zongmin, a rebel general under Li Zicheng. Wu is angered and he decides to ally with the Qing forces against the rebels.

Cast

 Wang Gang as Wang Cheng'en
  as the Chongzhen Emperor
  as Wu Sangui
  as Li Zicheng
 Zhang Lanlan as Chen Yuanyuan
 Tang Guoqiang as Huangtaiji
 Chen Daoming as the Tianqi Emperor
 Chen Baoguo as Zhu Changying
 Bao Guo'an as Hong Chengchou
  as Fan Renkuan
 Zhou Jie as Hou Chaozong
 Li Zhi as Dorgon
 Yan Kun as the Shunzhi Emperor
 Deng Chao as the Kangxi Emperor
 Xu Min as the Longwu Emperor
  as Wei Zhongxian
 He Xianda as Koxinga
  as Consort Zhuang
 Wang Minghu as Hooge
 Zhang Xiaozhong as Yuan Chonghuan
  as Empress Zhou
 Liu Jun as Huang Yu
 Ma Jie as Lu Si
  as Liu Zongmin
  as Zhou Yanru
  as the Tianqi Emperor's concubine
 Zeng Jing as Eunuch Li
 Liu Peiqing as Gao Yingxiang

List of featured songs 
 Ping'an Meng (《平安梦》; Dream of Peace) performed by Han Lei
 Bianshui Liu (《汴水流》; The Bian River Flows) performed by Han Lei and Liu Jin
 Dian Jiangchun Guiqing (《点绛唇·闺情》; Red Lips, Woman's Love) performed by Liu Jin
 Biyuntian (《碧云天》; Jade Cloud Sky) performed by Liu Jin

References

External links 
  The Affaire in the Swing Age on Sina.com
  The Affaire in the Swing Age on Xinhuanet.com

2003 Chinese television series debuts
Television series set in the Ming dynasty
Mandarin-language television shows
Television shows based on Chinese novels
Chinese historical television series
Television series set in the 17th century
Television shows written by Zhu Sujin